The Covenant Baptist Theological Seminary (CBTS) is a reformed baptist seminary in Owensboro, Kentucky, on the premises of Grace Reformed Baptist Church and led by President Sam Waldron. CBTS trains people who hold to the 1689 Baptist Confession of Faith to lead churches, domestically and internationally.

History
The Seminary was originally founded in 2005 as the Midwest Center for Theological Studies by Ted Christman, then pastor of Heritage Baptist Church in Owensboro, Kentucky. The seminary began with one faculty member, Sam Waldron, using a single classroom at Heritage Christian School. In August 2007 the seminary expanded temporarily to two rooms of a local law office, while the church made plans to build a $5.5 million, 38,000-square-foot addition to Heritage School. At that time, thirty to thirty-five  students were taught by three faculty, including Waldron, with three adjunct professors.

In 2015 the board of directors adopted the name Covenant Baptist Theological Seminary "in order more clearly to indicate both the mission of the Seminary and its theological viewpoint". The seminary gained accreditation through the Association of Reformed Theological Seminaries to offer a Master of Divinity (M. Div), a standard theological degree, in 2019.

Academics
The Seminary has increased its initial accredited offerings, from the Association of Reformed Theological Seminaries to include a Master of Divinity (MDiv), Master of Arts in Theological Studies (MATS), Master of Arts in Pastoral Studies (MAPS), and a Masters of Reformed Baptist Studies (MARBS).

Non-profit status 
According to Charity Navigator, "Covenant Baptist Theological Seminary is a 501(c)(3) organization, with an IRS ruling year of 2020".

References 

Seminaries and theological colleges in Kentucky
Education in Kentucky
Baptist Christianity in Kentucky
Reformed universities and colleges
Baptist seminaries and theological colleges in the United States
Calvinist organizations
Educational institutions established in 2005
Owensboro, Kentucky